Sharon Kips (born 17 November 1983 in Amsterdam, Netherlands) is the winner of the first edition of the Dutch X Factor, 24 February 2007. She was praised highly throughout the show, with high compliments from three of Holland's music experts Henk Temming, Marianne van Wijnkoop and Henkjan Smits. She beat contestants such as X6, Richy and Anja to become the eventual winner in February 2007.
Her first single Heartbreak Away reached #1 in the Dutch Top 40 in the first week. In 2010 she auditioned as a "mystery"-kandidate for the Dutch version of Popstars and got through to the liveshows. In the liveshows she was one of the favorites. She placed third overall.

Discography

Albums
2007: 10
2009: Love Will Bring You Home

Singles
2007: "Heartbreak away" (reached #1 in the Dutch Top 40)
2007: "Heaven Knows"
2010: "Love for Life"

Mixtapes
2001: Top Down Some Time In The 2 Game

References 

1983 births
Living people
Dutch people of Surinamese descent
Dutch pop singers
Dutch gospel singers
Musicians from Amsterdam
The X Factor winners
Popstars contestants
21st-century Dutch singers
21st-century Dutch women singers